Lucapinella versluysi is a species of sea snail, a marine gastropod mollusk in the family Fissurellidae, the keyhole limpets.

Description

Distribution
This species occurs in the Mediterranean Sea and in the Atlantic Ocean off the Cape Verdes, Senegal and Congo.

References

 Rolán E., 2005. Malacological Fauna From The Cape Verde Archipelago. Part 1, Polyplacophora and Gastropoda.

Fissurellidae
Molluscs of the Atlantic Ocean
Molluscs of the Mediterranean Sea
Gastropods of Cape Verde
Invertebrates of West Africa
Fauna of the Republic of the Congo
Gastropods described in 1900